Javier Akapo Martínez (born 3 September 1996) is a footballer who plays as a midfielder and a centre-back for UD Montijo and the Equatorial Guinea national team.

Early life
Akapo was born in Spain to an Equatoguinean father and Spanish mother.

International career
Akapo represented Equatorial Guinea at the 2015 COTIF Tournament. He debuted with the senior Equatorial Guinea national team in a 1–1 2022 FIFA World Cup qualification tie with Mauritania on 16 November 2021.

Personal life
Akapo is the younger brother of the professional footballer Carlos Akapo.

References

External links
 
 
 

1996 births
Living people
Citizens of Equatorial Guinea through descent
Equatoguinean footballers
Association football midfielders
Association football central defenders
Equatorial Guinea international footballers
Equatorial Guinea youth international footballers
Equatoguinean sportspeople of Spanish descent
Footballers from Elche
Spanish footballers
CD Binéfar players
CD Torrevieja players
Crevillente Deportivo players
CD Ibiza Islas Pitiusas players
Divisiones Regionales de Fútbol players
Tercera División players
Segunda Federación players
Spanish sportspeople of Equatoguinean descent
CF Intercity players